Stimulsoft Company is a software manufacturer in the sphere of Business Intelligence, data analysis, and processing. It develops reporting tools for variety of platforms (WinForms, ASP.NET, ASP.NET MVC, .NET Core, JavaScript, Java, PHP, WPF), keeping full compatibility between products. Stimulsoft Company is a provider of software for Business Intelligence in the Reporting Tool category.

Stimulsoft Products
Stimulsoft provides tools for designing and viewing reports on various platforms and for multiple devices. Users may use both components for specific technologies and standalone applications for Windows and macOS operating systems.

Awards 

 SQL Server Magazine: A bronze medal winner of the “2008 Editor’s Best Awards”;
 ComponentSource Top 100 Bestselling Publisher Award 2009-2010;
 ComponentSource Top 100 Bestselling Publisher Award 2010-2011.
 ComponentSource Top 100 Bestselling Publisher Award 2011-2012.
 ComponentSource Top 100 Bestselling Publisher Award 2012-2013.
 ComponentSource Top 100 Bestselling Publisher Award 2013-2014.
 ComponentSource Top 100 Bestselling Publisher Award 2014-2015.
 ComponentSource Top 100 Bestselling Publisher Award 2016.
 ComponentSource Top 50 Bestselling Publisher Award 2017.
 ComponentSource Top 50 Bestselling Publisher Award 2018.
 The Tabby Awards /Business 2014 Winner.
 ComponentSource Top 50 Bestselling Publisher Award 2022.

References

External links
Stimulsoft Reports official site

Reporting software